NGC 4919 is a lenticular galaxy located about 340 million light-years away in the constellation of Coma Berenices. NGC 4919 was discovered by astronomer Heinrich d'Arrest on May 5, 1864. NGC 4919 is a member of the Coma Cluster.

Other images

See also 
 List of NGC objects (4001–5000)
 NGC 7020

References

External links

Lenticular galaxies
Coma Berenices
4919
44885
8133
Astronomical objects discovered in 1864
Coma Cluster